The 2016 Quebec Men's Provincial Curling Championship, also known as the WFG Tankard, was held  from January 17 to 24 at the Salaberry Arena in Salaberry-de-Valleyfield, Quebec. The winning Jean-Michel Ménard team represented Quebec at the 2016 Tim Hortons Brier in Ottawa, Ontario. The event was held in conjunction with the 2016 Quebec Scotties Tournament of Hearts.

Qualification

Teams
Teams were as follows:

Round robin standings

Scores

January 17

Draw 1
Sunday, January 17, 15:00

January 18

Draw 2
Monday, January 18, 08:15

Draw 3
Monday, January 18, 12:00

Draw 4
Monday, January 18, 15:45

Draw 5
Monday, January 18, 19:30

January 19

Draw 6
Tuesday, January 19, 08:15

Draw 7
Tuesday, January 19, 12:00

Draw 8
Tuesday, January 19, 15:45

Draw 9
Tuesday, January 19, 19:30

January 20

Draw 10
Wednesday, January 20, 08:15

Draw 11
Wednesday, January 20, 12:00

Draw 12
Wednesday, January 20, 15:45

Draw 13
Wednesday, January 20, 19:30

January 21

Draw 14
Thursday, January 21, 09:00

Tiebreaker

Draw 15
Thursday, January 21, 14:00

Championship round

January 21

Draw 16
Thursday, January 21, 19:30

January 22

Draw 17
Friday, January 22, 10:00

Draw 18
Friday, January 22, 10:00

Tiebreaker

January 23

Draw 19
Saturday, January 23, 10:00

Playoffs

1 vs 2
Saturday, January 23, 14:30

3 vs 4
Saturday, January 23, 14:30

Semifinal
Sunday, January 24, 08:15

Final
Sunday, January 24, 15:45

References

Quebec Men's Provincial Curling Championship
Curling competitions in Quebec
Salaberry-de-Valleyfield
Quebec Men's Provincial